The 2008–09 season of the Portuguese Futsal First Division was the 19th season of top-tier futsal in Portugal and it was won by Benfica.

Teams 
  CF Belenenses
  FJ Antunes
  Benfica
  AR Freixieiro
  AD Fundão
  Instituto D. João V
  SL Olivais
  Sporting CP
  FC Alpendorada
  Modicus - Sandim
  Academico Mogadouro
  CF Sassoeiros
  Odivelas
  Nucleo Sportinguista de Tires

League table

Title Playoffs

Quarterfinals

1st Matches
16/5/2009
Sporting C.P. - A.R. Freixieiro 4-3 (1-1)
F.C. Alpendorada - C.F. Belenenses 4-7 (1-2)
AD Fundão - Fundação Jorge Antunes 5-1 (2-0)
Instituto D. João V - S.L. Benfica 1-4 (1-3)

2nd Matches
23/5/2009
A.R. Freixieiro - Sporting C.P. 7-6 (0-1)
C.F. Belenenses - F.C. Alpendorada 5-2 (1-1)
Fundação Jorge Antunes - AD Fundão 6-4 (3-1)
S.L. Benfica - Instituto D. João V 4-2 (3-1)

3rd Matches - If necessary
24/5/2009
A.R. Freixieiro - Sporting C.P. 4-3 (3-0)
Fundação Jorge Antunes - AD Fundão 5-3 (2-3)

Semifinals

1st Matches
6/6/2009
A.R. Freixieiro - S.L. Benfica 9-10 ap; 4-4 (4-2)
C.F. Belenenses - Fundação Jorge Antunes 7-4 a2ndet; 4-4 a1stet; 3-3 (2-0)

2nd Matches
13/6/2009
S.L. Benfica - A.R. Freixieiro 4-3 (2-2)
Fundação Jorge Antunes - C.F. Belenenses 3-2 a2ndet; 2-2 a1stet; 2-2 (1-1)

3rd Matches - If necessary
14/6/2009
Fundação Jorge Antunes - C.F. Belenenses 3-4 (1-2)

Final

1st Match
20/6/2009
S.L. Benfica - C.F. Belenenses 6-2 (1-0)

2nd Match
21/6/2009
S.L. Benfica - C.F. Belenenses 2-3 (1-1)

3rd Match
27/6/2009
C.F. Belenenses - S.L. Benfica 3-2 (3-1)

4th Match - If necessary
28/6/2009
C.F. Belenenses - S.L. Benfica 3-6 (3-3)

5th Match - If necessary
30/6/2009
S.L. Benfica - C.F. Belenenses 4-3 a.2nd.e.t (3-2 a.1st.e.t;2-2;2-0)

Portuguese Futsal Play-Off 2008/2009 Winner: Benfica

External links
www.fpf.pt

Futsal
Portuguese Futsal First Division seasons
Portugal